Haseeb Hassan (sometimes Haseeb Hasan) is a veteran Pakistani television drama and film director. He is known for his dramas Alif, Dhoop Ki Deewar, Mann Mayal, Ahista Ahista, Dayar-e-Dil and Bol Meri Machli. He also directed Parwaaz Hai Junoon which received many awards including 18th Lux Style Awards.

Career 
Haseeb Hasan was born on 8 January 1977. 

He is known for multiple award-winning projects including Dayar-e-Dil, Nanhi, Mann Mayal, Bol Meri Machlee and highest-grossing film of 2018 Parwaaz Hai Junoon. After having a blockbuster film & more than a dozen dramas in his name, he made a venture with digital world India to produce his web series Dhoop Ki Deewar which is now being aired on Zee5. Series Dhoop ki Deewar is written by famous novel & drama writer Umera Ahmad and this series reflects the living conditions of the families of the martyrs during the war, their difficulties, dreams and obstacles to reach their dreams.

Projects

Films

Television & Web series

Awards

 Nominated in 3rd Hum Awards for the best director of the year 2014 for drama serial Aahista Aahista
 Winner in 4th Hum Awards for the best director of the year 2015 for drama serial Dayar-e-Dil
 Nominated in 1st IPPA Awards for the best director of the year 2016 for drama serial Mann Mayal
 Prestigious UAE Golden Visa from UAE Government for contributing Film and TV for Global Audience of Urdu language

Lux Style Awards

References

Living people
Pakistani film directors
1977 births